"Like That" is a song recorded by Chinese-Canadian rapper and singer Kris Wu, released on May 18, 2018, through Ace Unit Culture, Interscope, Universal Music China and Go East, as the second single from his debut studio album Antares.

Background and composition
"Like That" was written and composed by Kris Wu, Markous Roberts, Louis Bell and Jeffrey Smith, while production was handled by Fki 1st and Track Bangas with co-production from Smitty.

Commercial performance
"Like That" debuted at no. 73 of the Billboard Hot 100 and in the top forty of the Hot R&B/Hip-Hop Songs on issue date June 2, 2018, and left the chart the following week.

Charts

References

2018 songs
2018 singles
Songs written by Louis Bell